The Puppet-Show (1848–1849) was a British humorous and satirical weekly magazine, a short-lived imitator of Punch, edited by John Bridgeman from offices at 11 Wellington Street North in London. The first issue was published on 18 March 1848. The primary targets of its political satire were Lord Russell's Whig ministry, Chartists, Irish nationalists, and the French.

References

External links
 Scans on Google Books

Defunct magazines published in the United Kingdom
Magazines established in 1848
Magazines disestablished in 1849
Satirical magazines published in the United Kingdom
Weekly magazines published in the United Kingdom
Magazines published in London
British political satire